Maksym Kryvonis ( "Crooked-nose", or Perebyinis) (d. 1648) was one of the Cossack leaders of Khmelnytsky Uprising.

Origins

The question about his origins remains unresolved. A Polish pamphlet published in 1648 states that he was a serf of the Nemyrych family (a hypothesis favoured by Soviet historiography). However, a German source about a meeting with Kryvonis in 1648 says that he is of Scottish origin ("ein gebohrenen Schott") In this case his real name may well have been not a nickname based on his crooked or broken nose, but a translation of his Scottish family name Cameron.

Khmelnytsky Uprising
Kryvonis was one of the most effective generals of the Uprising. He was awarded the rank of colonel of Cherkasy Regiment. His actions in Korsun and Pylyavtsi battles in 1648 led to crushing Cossack victories over the Polish armies. His actions against prince Jeremi Wiśniowiecki at Makhnivka and Starokostiantyniv were less successful.

Also there are different accounts of Kryvonis's demise: killed (shot) during the siege of Lviv, assassinated (poisoned) by Jesuits, killed by orders of Bohdan Khmelnytsky who loathed him, or perished of plague during the siege of Zamość in 1648.

In literature
Kryvonis (Polish: Maksym Krzywonos) was also a character in With Fire and Sword, a novel by Nobel-winning 19th-century Polish author Henryk Sienkiewicz. In the 1999 movie based on the novel he was played by Maciej Kozłowski.

References

External links
Article on the Ukrainian Government Portal

Ukrainian Cossacks
Colonels of the Cossack Hetmanate
1648 deaths
Zaporozhian Cossack military personnel of the Khmelnytsky Uprising
Ukrainian people of Scottish descent
Year of birth unknown